Spartans Football Club Women's and Girl's is a women's football team that plays in the Scottish Women's Premier League, the top division of women's football in Scotland. Spartans F.C. Women is part of Spartans F.C. in North Edinburgh and play and train at the club's training facilities.

History
Founded in 1985, the club was known as Hailes United, Edinburgh Star, Tynecastle, Bonnyrigg Rose and Whitehill Welfare over the first twenty years of its existence. While operating as Whitehill Welfare the club was promoted to the Scottish Women's Premier League in 2004. After two seasons as Edinburgh Ladies in 2006–07 and 2007–08, the club came under the auspices of East of Scotland Football League club Spartans F.C. in 2008 and adopted their current name.

Having won the Scottish Women's Premier League Cup as Edinburgh Ladies in 2007, Spartans lost a further three League Cup finals in 2009, 2010 and 2011. They also finished as runners-up twice to Glasgow City in the 2008–09 and 2010–11 Premier League.

Current squad 
As of 28 Aug 2022

References

External links
Soccerway
Spartans FC Women website

Women's football clubs in Scotland
Football clubs in Edinburgh
Association football clubs established in 1985
1985 establishments in Scotland
Scottish Women's Premier League clubs
Spartans F.C.